Day House is a historic home located at Springfield, Greene County, Missouri. It was built in 1875, and is a two-story, five bay, "L"-plan brick dwelling.  It features a mansard roof with triple dormers.  It was the home of Springfield businessman and local politician, George Sale Day.

It was listed on the National Register of Historic Places in 1976.

References

Houses on the National Register of Historic Places in Missouri
Houses completed in 1875
Buildings and structures in Springfield, Missouri
National Register of Historic Places in Greene County, Missouri